Ahmet Altun (born 25 January 1958) is a Turkish long-distance runner. He competed in the marathon at the 1984 Summer Olympics and the 1988 Summer Olympics.

References

1958 births
Living people
Athletes (track and field) at the 1984 Summer Olympics
Athletes (track and field) at the 1988 Summer Olympics
Turkish male long-distance runners
Turkish male marathon runners
Olympic athletes of Turkey
Sportspeople from Ankara
Mediterranean Games silver medalists for Turkey
Mediterranean Games medalists in athletics
Athletes (track and field) at the 1983 Mediterranean Games
20th-century Turkish people
21st-century Turkish people